Amorpha-4,11-diene 12-monooxygenase (CYP71AV1) is an enzyme with systematic name amorpha-4,11-diene,NADPH:oxygen oxidoreductase (12-hydroxylating). This enzyme catalyses the following chemical reaction

 amorpha-4,11-diene + 3 O2 + 3 NADPH + 3 H+  artemisinate + 3 NADP+ + 4 H2O (overall reaction)
(1a) amorpha-4,11-diene + O2 + NADPH + H+  artemisinic alcohol + NADP+ + H2O
(1b) artemisinic alcohol + O2 + NADPH + H+  artemisinic aldehyde + NADP+ + 2 H2O
(1c) artemisinic aldehyde + O2 + NADPH + H+  artemisinate + NADP+ + H2O

Amorpha-4,11-diene 12-monooxygenase is a heme-thiolate protein (P-450)

References

External links 
 

EC 1.14.13